Claire Richards  (born 17 August 1977) is an English singer who is best known for being in the pop group Steps.

Richards was a contestant on the second series of Popstar to Operastar before being voted off in the semi finals. She possesses the vocal range of a soprano. On 3 January 2013, Richards entered Celebrity Big Brother and came in fourth place. From April to June 2014, she was a regular panellist on Loose Women. Richards took part in the fourth series of The Masked Singer UK and was unmasked as “Knitting”.

Early life 
Richards began her career in the pop trio TSD. They had little success and were dropped by their record label Avex after the release of their second single "Baby I Love You". She went on to work as a receptionist for seven months, winning the temporary worker of the month award for May 1997.

Career

Steps 

Richards auditioned for the lineup that would become Steps. She was offered a place in the group on the condition that she lost weight. Steps were formed by Steve Crosby & Barry Upton (writers of "5, 6, 7, 8") alongside Manager Tim Byrne after auditioning hopefuls who answered an ad in The Stage newspaper. She joined the group in 1997 along with Ian "H" Watkins, Lisa Scott-Lee, Faye Tozer and Lee Latchford-Evans, and the band enjoyed considerable popularity across the world over the next five years.

Steps reformed in May 2011 for a four-part documentary series on Sky Living titled Steps: Reunion. The series started airing on 28 September, following an announcement of a second greatest hits album, The Ultimate Collection, that was released on 10 October 2011. The album entered the charts at number one, becoming the band's third album to achieve this feat. The second series of Steps: Reunion titled "Steps: On the Road Again" aired on Sky Living in April 2012; the series followed the band as they embarked on their sellout 22-date UK tour. On 24 September 2012, the group confirmed they would release their fourth studio album Light Up The World on 12 November 2012, alongside a six-date Christmas tour, starting from 30 November and ending on 5 December. The group reformed for a second time on 1 January 2017 in celebration of their 20th anniversary, and later announced their fifth studio album Tears on the Dancefloor, which was released in April 2017 and entered the charts at number 2. On 5 March 2017, the group confirmed the release of the new album, alongside its lead single, "Scared of the Dark", and a 22-date tour, Party on the Dancefloor. A deluxe edition of the album, titled Tears on the Dancefloor: Crying at the Disco, was released on 27 October.

In November 2017, Tozer announced that the reunion was no longer just a 20th-anniversary celebration and that the group intends to continue after their 2018 Summer of Steps tour. In April 2018, Richards announced that following their summer tour, they would begin work on their sixth studio album. In February 2019, Richards announced the group would begin recording their next album during the summer months.

On 7 September 2020, via their social media accounts, Steps announced the release date of their album entitled What the Future Holds. The album was released on 27 November of the same year, with pre-orders available from 8 September. The next day, they confirmed a new 14-date UK tour (with special guest Sophie Ellis-Bextor) starting in November 2021. The first single from the album was the Greg Kurstin-and-Sia-penned "What the Future Holds", released on 9 September 2020. It was followed by "Something in Your Eyes" on 27 October 2020. "To the Beat of My Heart" was released as the album's third single in January 2021.

The first single of What the Future Holds Pt. 2 was confirmed as a reworked version of "Heartbreak in This City" featuring Michelle Visage.

Solo career 
After Richards and her fellow group mate Ian "H" Watkins resigned during the last leg of their final tour, the two continued singing as the duo H & Claire. The pair experienced success with their debut single "DJ", which reached No. 3 on the UK Singles Chart, and their next two singles, which both charted in the top 10. While the duo had initial success, their album Another You, Another Me, which was released in 2002, did not chart high. Richards also co hosted alongside Brian Dowling and Tess Daly on SMTV Live in 2002. She took a break from singing to plan her wedding to Steps dancer Mark Webb. H & Claire disbanded in 2003. After leaving her music career, Richards wanted to take a break from music and concentrate on other projects; she was set to release a debut solo album but due to falling pregnant Richards decided to not pursue music any further. In 2013, she announced on Twitter that there was a possibility of her producing a solo album to the success of Steps.

Richards released her first solo material, a cover of the Steps track "One for Sorrow" on 30 July 2015 via her official SoundCloud. The acoustic version of the track was recorded for an event honouring Steps' producer Pete Waterman. The track was arranged and produced by Steve Anderson with whom Richards was now working on a full album. In September 2015, after much fan demand, Richards released a stripped back version of "Deeper Shade of Blue". The track, which was recorded in one take was released on Amazon, iTunes and streaming services on 4 September.

It was announced on 3 August 2018 that Richards was to release her debut solo album, My Wildest Dreams on 2 November 2018. It was preceded by the lead single, "On My Own", which was released on 6 August. It was announced on 8 October 2018, via her official Twitter, that the album had been delayed until 1 February 2019.
The album reached #9 in the UK Albums Chart and was promoted with a small theatre tour across venues in the UK.

Television 
It was announced in May 2011 that Richards would be taking part in the second series of Popstar to Operastar making it her first major high-profile appearance in nearly ten years. The series started on ITV on 5 June. She appeared on OK! TV on 6 June to promote the show. Despite a much-praised performance of the Queen of the Night aria from Mozart's Magic Flute in the semi-final, she lost out on a place in the final to Cheryl Baker.

Richards was a contestant on eleventh series of Celebrity Big Brother and came fourth place as the show ended on 25 January 2013.

On 1 and 7 April 2014, Richards was a guest panellist on the ITV lunchtime chat show Loose Women. Following this, she became a permanent panellist, making her debut on 10 April 2014. She subsequently made a further seven appearances, with her last being on 23 June 2014.

On 8 August 2017, Richards made a cameo appearance as herself on the BBC Scotland soap opera River City.

Personal life 
Richards has a younger sister called Gemma, who appears in the 'Tragedy' video as her bridesmaid.
Richards married her first husband Mark Webb, a backing dancer with Steps, in 2003. The couple divorced in 2005 when Richards rekindled her romance with Reece Hill. Richards' first child, Charlie, was born on 8 May 2007. In January 2008, Richards and Hill announced their engagement and were married 1 November 2008. Richards announced in the 30 June 2009 edition of Woman magazine that she was expecting her second child with her husband, and gave birth to a girl named Daisy on 29 December 2009.

On 13 September 2008, she performed "Tragedy" on the show Everybody Dance Now without the other members of Steps. Richards appeared on Celebrity MasterChef on 25 June 2009 as part of the programme's "comeback" week. Claire Richards: My Big Fat Wedding, a programme following Claire on her journey to lose weight before her wedding, was shown on BBC Three in May 2009. The programme featured her wedding and a reunion of all Steps members and drew an audience of over 763,000. Richards released a fitness DVD Five Step Fat Attack on 26 December 2008.

Discography

Studio albums

Singles

References

External links 
Official website
ClaireRichards.Net – original fansite
Generation STEPS

1977 births
English women singers
English sopranos
Living people
People from Hillingdon
Popstar to Operastar contestants
Steps (group) members
People from Uxbridge